The 1999 South American Youth Championship (Sudamericana sub-20) is a football competition contested by all ten U-20 national football teams of CONMEBOL. The tournament was held in Argentina between January 5 and January 25, 1999, the 23rd time the competition had been held and the 2nd to take place in the country. Argentina finished undefeated, winning their 3rd trophy.

Format
The teams are separated in two groups of five, and each team plays four matches in a pure round-robin stage. The three top competitors advance to a single final group of six, wherein each team plays five matches. The top four teams in the final group qualify to the 1999 FIFA World Youth Championship.

Squads
For a list of all the squads in the final tournament, see 1999 South American Youth Championship squads.

The following teams entered the tournament:

  (host)

First group stage

Group A

Results

Group B

Results

Final group

Qualification to World Youth Championship
The four best performing teams qualified for the 1999 FIFA World Youth Championship.

Goalscorers

9 goals
 Luciano Galletti

7 goals
 Rodrigo Gral

5 goals
 Nicolás Córdova
 Edu

4 goals
 Javier Chevantón
 Patricio Neira

3 goals
 Gamadiel García
 David Pizarro
 Ronaldinho
 Roque Santa Cruz

2 goals
 Omar Pouso
 Rodolfo Moya
 Aldo Duscher
 Pablo Aimar
 Daniel Montenegro
 Germán Rivarola
 Ernesto Farías
 Juan Arango
 Leandro Sequera
 Marco Bonito
 Luis Cordero
 Fernando Carreño
 Salvador Cabañas
 Nelson Vera

1 goal
 Rubén Alamanza
 Fernando Crosa
 Líder Mejía
 Gerzon Chacón
 Rubén Alamanza
 Eriberto
 Cassio Lincoln
 Fábio Aurélio
 Ronald García
 Matuzalém
 Mauricio Molina
 César Pellegrín
 Diego Forlán
 Marcos Aguilera
 Fabián Canobbio
 Carlos Bueno
 Paulo da Silva
 Cristian Gil

1 goal (cont.)
 Oswaldo Carrión
 Nelson Cuevas
 Marcio Carioca
 Rubén Maldonado
 Marcinho
 Marcio Carioca
 Esteban Cambiasso
 Milovan Mirosevic
 Marcio Carioca
 Sergio Fernandez
 Maricá
 Piero Alva
 Pedro Ascoy
 Gonzalo Sorondo
 Gustavo Victoria
 Ronald Gutiérrez
 Ferdy Apuri
 Jeffrey Díaz

Notes
Argentina and Uruguay were looking to finish in the top 4 in order to qualify for the World Youth Championship, a competition which the two sides have thoroughly dominated, having won 9 of the 16 World Youth titles between them.

External links
Results by RSSSF

Youth Championship
1998–99 in Argentine football
South American Youth Championship
International association football competitions hosted by Argentina
1999 in youth association football